Route 117, the Trans Canada Highway Northern Route, is a provincial highway within the Canadian province of Quebec, running between Montreal and the Quebec/Ontario border where it continues as Highway 66 east of McGarry, Ontario. It is an important road since it is the only direct route between southern Quebec and the Abitibi-Témiscamingue region.

Route 117 was formerly Route 11 and ran from Montreal north towards Mont-Laurier and then followed the Gatineau River south towards Gatineau. This routing is joined with Autoroute 15 from Montreal northwards towards Mont Tremblant. Route 117 also takes in the former Quebec Routes 58 and 59.

Along with Autoroute 15 to Sainte-Agathe-des-Monts, it is also listed as a branch of the Trans-Canada Highway.

Route description 
This description of Route 117 follows it from southeast to northwest.

Route 117 starts in Montreal at the Decarie Interchange where Autoroute 40 and Autoroute 15 (Decarie Expressway) meet. Montrealers sometimes unofficially extend Route 117 along the portion of Decarie Boulevard that runs parallel to the Decarie Expressway.

From the Decarie Interchange, Route 117 goes north on Marcel-Laurin Boulevard to Keller Boulevard. It continues from Laurentian Boulevard to Keller Boulevard, southbound only, or on Lachapelle Street from Keller Boulevard, northbound only, and crosses the Rivière des Prairies over the Lachapelle Bridge to Île Jésus. It continues through the Laval neighborhoods of Chomedey, Fabreville and Sainte-Rose, northbound as Boulevard Curé-Labelle, Boulevard Chomedey at the former Chenoy's deli, left turn at Boulevard Cartier and back into Boulevard Curé-Labelle, southbound as Boulevard Curé-Labelle.

At the Rivière des Mille Îles, it crosses over the Marius Dufresne Bridge to the "North Shore" (of the Rivière des Mille Îles). Then, Route 117 runs parallel to Autoroute 15 until Sainte-Agathe-des-Monts and goes through the Laurentian mountains. Towns along the route in this section include:
Rosemère
Sainte-Thérèse
Blainville
Mirabel
Saint-Jérôme
Prévost
Piedmont
Sainte-Adèle
Val Morin
Val-David
Sainte-Agathe-des-Monts

After Sainte-Agathe-des-Monts, Route 117 continues as a four-lane divided highway and winds its way through Laurentides Regional County Municipality until it reaches the town of Labelle. From then on to the Ontario border, Route 117 is mostly a standard two-lane highway. In Grand-Remous, Route 117 crosses the Gatineau River and intersects with Route 105, which goes southwest to Maniwaki and Gatineau. Towns along the route in this section include:
 Mont-Blanc
 Mont-Tremblant
 La Conception
 Labelle
 Rivière-Rouge 
 Lac-Saguay
 Lac-des-Écorces
 Mont-Laurier
 Grand-Remous

From Grand-Remous, the route heads north for some  through undeveloped wilderness, most of which is part of La Vérendrye Wildlife Reserve. While the reserve is popular for a variety of outdoor activities, services along the road are sparse. This section is often considered one of the most dangerous routes in the province because of numerous fatal accidents, some involving tractor-trailers. During the winter, the route is often extremely slippery, even during dry and clear days. The few communities along this section are:
 Réservoir-Dozois
 Val-d'Or

After the intersection with Route 113, which continues north to Lebel-sur-Quévillon, Route 117 heads west to Ontario where it becomes Highway 66. The section between Rouyn-Noranda and Arntfield runs concurrent with Route 101. Towns along the route in this section include:
Val-d'Or
Malartic
Rivière-Héva
Rouyn-Noranda

Major intersections

See also
List of Quebec provincial highways
Golden Highway (Ontario)

References

External links  

 Interactive Provincial Route Map (Transports Québec) 

117
Quebec 117
Roads in Laval, Quebec
Roads in Montreal
Transport in Rouyn-Noranda
Roads in Abitibi-Témiscamingue
Roads in Laurentides